The siege of Tournai may refer to:
 Siege of Tournai (1197) : The Count of Flanders and Hainault, Baldwin VI of Hainaut unsuccessfully besieged it.
 Siege of Tournai (1213) : Infante Ferdinand, husband of Jeanne, Countess of Flanders, besieged and took the city on 1 October 1213
 Siege of Tournai (1303) : during the Franco-Flemish War, besieged by Flemish troops, siege ended by a treaty
 Siege of Tournai (1340) : during the Hundred Years' War, the city was unsuccessfully besieged by the English and their Flemish allies
 Siege of Tournai (1513) : during Henry VIII of England's campaigns against France
 Siege of Tournai (1521) : during the Italian War of 1521–1526, the city was taken from the French by the Holy Roman Empire
 Siege of Tournai (1581)
 Siege of Tournai (1667) : during the War of Devolution
 Siege of Tournai (1709) : during the War of the Spanish Succession
 Siege of Tournai (1745) : after the battle of Fontenoy, capitulation 22 May